Marian Fernando Huja (born 5 August 1999) is a Portuguese professional footballer who plays as a centre-back for Liga I club Petrolul Ploiești.

Club career

Early career / HB Køge
Huja represented AC Cacém, Belenenses and Watford at junior level.

In 2018, he signed his first professional contract after a successful try-out at Danish team HB Køge. He made his senior debut for the club on 29 July that year, in a 5–2 home win over FC Roskilde in the second league.

Petrolul Ploiești
On 26 September 2020, HB Køge announced that Huja was sold to Romanian Liga II side Petrolul Ploiești. He made his competitive debut on 18 October in a 2–1 away win over Comuna Recea, and on 25 November scored his first goal in a draw with Buzău.

Personal life
Huja was born in Portugal to Romanian parents from Oaș Country, Transylvania.

Honours
Petrolul Ploiești
Liga II: 2021–22

References

External links
The story of Marian Huja career | oraexactainfotbal.ro 

1999 births
Living people
People from Sintra
Portuguese footballers
Sportspeople from Lisbon District
Portuguese people of Romanian descent
Association football defenders
Danish 1st Division players
Liga I players
Liga II players
HB Køge players
FC Petrolul Ploiești players
Portugal youth international footballers
Portuguese expatriate footballers
Expatriate footballers in Romania
Portuguese expatriate sportspeople in Romania
Expatriate men's footballers in Denmark
Portuguese expatriate sportspeople in Denmark